Asgarby may refer to the following places in Lincolnshire, England:

 Asgarby, East Lindsey, near Spilsby
 Asgarby, North Kesteven, near Sleaford

See also
 Asgarby and Howell, a civil parish in Lincolnshire, England
 John de Asgarby, Chancellor of the University of Cambridge in 1267